Matilda Heming, née Lowry (1796–1855) was a British watercolourist.

Biography
Heming was born in London, England. She was the daughter of Wilson Lowry. The engraver Joseph Wilson Lowry was her younger half-brother. She is known for watercolour portraits, but her landscape watercolour Backwater, Weymouth, was included in the 1905 book Women Painters of the World. Today it is in the collection of the British Museum, along with a few more landscapes and a portrait she made of the writer Mary Somerville.

References

1796 births
1855 deaths
Painters from London
British women painters